George Metallinos ( Georgios Metallinos; 11 March 1940 – 19 December 2019) was a Greek Orthodox theologian, priest (protopresbyter), historian, author and professor.

Biography
He was born in Corfu, Greece on 11 March 1940, where he also completed his Secondary Education. He was a graduate of the University of Athens in Theology (1962) and Classical Literature (1967). After his military service (1963–1965) he became Research Assistant at the Department of Patrology and in 1969 he went to Western Germany for postgraduate studies in Bonn and Cologne, where he resided until 1975. During this time he also conducted studies and archival research in England. In 1971, he was ordained a member of the clergy and became Doctor of Theology (University of Athens) and Doctor of Philosophy - History (University of Cologne). 

In 1984 he became professor at the School of Theology of the University of Athens, teaching History of Spirituality during the Post-Byzantine Period, History and Theology of Worship, and Byzantine History. He served as Dean of the School of Theology between 2004 and 2007, when he was emerited.

Quotes
"The Resurrection of Christ is the most significant event to take place in History. It is the event that differentiates Christianity from every other religion. Other religions have mortal leaders, whereas the Head of the Church is the Resurrected Christ.  “Resurrection of Christ” implies the deification and the resurrection of human nature, and the hope for deification and resurrection of our own hypostasis. Since the medicine has been discovered, there is hope for life. 

Through Christ's Resurrection, both life and death take on a new meaning. “Life” now means communion with God;  “Death” is no longer the end of this present lifetime, but the distancing of Man from Christ. The separation of the soul from the mortal body is no longer seen as “death”; it is only a temporary slumber." 

From: The Resurrection of Christ is the Annihilation of Death 

"Orthodoxy does not wish to be a religious community for charitable services, nor a human organization which strives only for peace on earth and coexistence among nations. Orthodoxy wishes to be, above all, Body of Christ, a salvation laboratory for healing human existence, which is basic prerequisite for man's formation at the limits of authentic communion with God and the world. 

Moreover, there is no evolutionary process in Orthodoxy by the meaning of continuous change. Our course is Christ-centered with no changes. Christ remains the absolute center and reference point of Orthodox people in all times. He secures our unity throughout time, with His presence within ourselves. His uncreated action is uniting (in the horizontal, as well as vertical dimension) the faithful people throughout history and accomplishes their unity, not as subjection under fixed norms of living and acting, but as life resulting by His presence within themselves." 

From: Orthodox Spirituality - Mutual Concession of Present and Future Life

See also

 John Romanides
 Gnosiology
 Hierotheos (Vlachos)
 Nikolaos Loudovikos
 Vladimir Lossky
 Hesychasm
 Theoria
 Theosis (Eastern Orthodox theology)

References

Sources
 Tribute to Fr. George Metallinos - Biographical Notes, Bibliography, and Collection of Articles (Website in Greek), retrieved on February 9, 2009
 About Theology. Personal Website of Pavlos Vatavalis (in Greek), retrieved on February 9, 2009

External links
 The Resurrection of Christ is the Annihilation of Death by Protopresbyter Fr. George Metallinos.
 Orthodox Spirituality - Mutual Concession of Present and Future Life by Protopresbyter Fr. George Metallinos.
 Orthodoxy as Therapy by Protopresbyter George Metallinos.
 Orthodoxy's Worship by Protopresbyter George Metallinos.
 Philokalian Distinction between Orthodoxy and Heresy by Protopresbyter George Metallinos.
 The Importance of Hesychasm in the History of the Roman Nation by Protopresbyter George Metallinos.
Orthodox and European Culture - The Struggle between Hellenism and Frankism. Excerpts from the speech of Fr. Georgios Metallinos, Professor at the University of Athens, during the February '95 Theological Conference in Pirgos, Greece.
Faith and Science in Orthodox Gnosiology and Methodology University of Athens, Department of Theology, The Very Rev. Prof. Dr. George Metallinos.
 Paradise and Hell According to Orthodox Tradition  Fr. George Metallinos on OrthodoxyToday.org.
 Fabrications about John S. Romanides by Capuchino Priest Ianni Spiteri. Response by Prof. George Metallinos of The University of Athens. First published by Εκκλησιαστική Αλήθεια, the official newspaper of the Church of Greece, April 1–16, 1995, p. 14.
 A Critique of a Critique - In Response to Professor John Erickson. Critique of a Review of a Book on the Nature of Orthodox Baptism written by Fr. George Metallinos.  Orthodox Christian Information Center.
 The Argument is not one of Calendars: It is conflicting Dogma and Theology that Lead to separate Celebrations of Pascha by Archpriest George Metallinos from the Website of St Nicholas Russian Orthodox Church, McKinney, Texas. This article had originally appeared in the Athens newspaper Καθημερινή (14 April 1996, p. 7).
 I Confess one Baptism by Protopresbyter George  Metallinos, D. Th., Ph. D. from the website of the Orthodox Outlet for Dogmatic Enquiries. Printed by St. Paul's Monastery, Holy Mountain, 1994, 
 Heresies, Ecumenism: The Ecumenist Dialogues Unmasked by Protopresbyter George Metallinos.
 How the Pope became Infallible by Fr. George Metallinos, Printed by Protypes Thessalikes Ekdoseis, Trikala, Greece, 2002,    
 Bibliography of Fr. George Metallinos 
 Collection of Articles by Fr. George Metallinos 

1940 births
2019 deaths
Greek theologians
Writers from Corfu
20th-century Greek historians
Greek Eastern Orthodox priests
Eastern Orthodox theologians
National and Kapodistrian University of Athens alumni
University of Cologne alumni
Academic staff of the National and Kapodistrian University of Athens 
20th-century Eastern Orthodox priests
21st-century Eastern Orthodox priests
Clergy from Corfu
21st-century Greek historians